This Is Absolutely Real: Visions and Versions of Phil Ochs is a cover album by American blues and folk musician Pat Wictor. The songs included were all written by US singer-songwriter Phil Ochs. It was released in 2017 on Wictor's independent label, RiskyDisc Records.

In Sing Out!, Ron Olesko described This Is Absolutely Real as a "welcome collection" that "celebrates two outstanding voices—the iconic Phil Ochs as well as contemporary folk music's standard-bearer, Pat Wictor." He wrote that it would have been easy to choose a group of well-known songs by Ochs, but instead "Pat took a different—and ultimately a more relevant approach" by covering songs that are not as well known. Wictor's song selection and his recordings, Olesko wrote, "show the beautiful poetry that embodied the work of Phil Ochs. ... By choosing these deeper tracks from Phil Ochs song book, Pat reveals both the beauty and depth of Ochs' artistic achievements while adding to his own impressive accomplishments as a creative musician."

The nine songs on This Is Absolutely Real include some that were recorded professionally and released by Ochs and others, such as "First Snow" and "I'm Tired", that were recorded as demos and released after his 1976 death.

Track listing

Personnel
Pat Wictor – vocals, slide guitar, acoustic guitar, electric guitars

Additional personnel
Harmony vocals: Gretchen Schultz
Bass: Chico Huff, Ken Pendergast, Mark Murphy
Drums/Percussion: Cheryl Prashker, Matt Scarano
Harmonica: Bob Beach
Vibraphone: Behn Gillece
Marimba: Carolyn Stallard

Production
Produced by Pat Wictor
Mixed and mastered by Glenn Barratt, Morningstar Studios, East Norriton, Pennsylvania
Recorded by Glenn Barratt and Dave Schonauer, Morningstar Studios
Additional recording:
 by Ross Bonadonna at Wombat Recording Co., Brooklyn, New York, and
 by Todd Giudice at Roots Cellar, Newburgh, New York

References

External links
This Is Absolutely Real: Visions and Versions of Phil Ochs at Pat Wictor's website
Additional reviews of This Is Absolutely Real: Visions and Versions of Phil Ochs

2017 albums
Phil Ochs tribute albums
Self-released albums